Victor Perez or Víctor Pérez may refer to:

Victor Perez (Tunisian boxer) (1911–1945), Tunisian boxer 
Victor Young Perez, 2013 French biographical film about Victor Perez
Víctor Pérez (Puerto Rican boxer) (born 1971) 
Víctor Pérez (director) (born 1981), Spanish director, producer and digital film compositor 
Victor Perez (golfer) (born 1992), French golfer
Víctor Pérez (weightlifter) (born 1953), Cuban Olympic weightlifter
Víctor Pérez (footballer) (born 1988), Spanish footballer
Víctor Pérez Varela, Chilean politician
Víctor Pablo Pérez (born 1954), Spanish conductor
Víctor Pérez Pérez, Mexican journalist murdered in 2014
Víctor Manuel Pérez Rojas (1940–2019), Venezuelan bishop

See also: All pages with titles containing Victor Perez